Killaly is a surname. Notable people with the surname include:

Alicia Killaly (1836–1908), Canadian painter
Hamilton Hartley Killaly (1800–1874), Canadian civil engineer and politician
John Killaly (1776–1832), Irish civil engineer